Tresparrett Posts is a hamlet in the civil parish of St Gennys in north Cornwall, England, United Kingdom.

References

Hamlets in Cornwall